Marion Cunningham (December 30, 1895 – January 28, 1982), nicknamed "Daddy", was an American Negro league first baseman in the 1920s.

A native of Montgomery, Alabama, Cunningham was the younger brother of fellow-Negro leaguer John Cunningham. He made his Negro leagues debut in 1921 with the Montgomery Grey Sox, and went on to play for the Memphis Red Sox in 1924 and 1925. Cunningham died in Montgomery in 1982 at age 86.

References

External links
 and Seamheads

1895 births
1982 deaths
Memphis Red Sox players
Montgomery Grey Sox players
Baseball first basemen
Baseball players from Montgomery, Alabama
20th-century African-American sportspeople